ViBGYOR Film Festival  is an international short and documentary film festival held annually in Thrissur City in Kerala state of India. ViBGYOR Film Festival is organised by ViBGYOR Film collective, a coalition of Chetana Media Institute, Nottam Traveling Film Festival, Navachitra Film Society, Visual Search, Moving Republic, Cense, GAIA, with the support of Thrissur Municipal Corporation, Jilla Panchayath, Federation of Film Societies of India, Kerala Chalachitra Academy, Information & Public Relations, ActionAid India, ICCO-South Asia and other various Film Societies.

Film Spectrum
The ViBGYOR Film Festival is the largest alternate film festival in South Asia. It is a five-day-long film festival held every year at the Sangeetha Nataka Akademy Campus in, Thrissur. Celebrating Identities and Diversities is the central theme of ViBGYOR. VIBGYOR have 3 type film packages as listed blow
 Focus of the year package with different topics each year
 ViBGYOR Spectrum package divided into following seven sub categories
 Identities
 Rights
 Environment and Developmentalism
 Nation state
 Gender and Sexuality
 Fundamentalism V/s Diversity
 Culture and Media
 Kerala Spectrum Package for films from Kerala

Genres
Animation, Documentary, Experimental, Music Video and Short films.

Event history
 First Edition: February 2006
 Second Edition: May 2007
 Third Edition: February 2008
 Fourth edition: February 2009
 Fifth edition: February 2010
 Sixth edition: January 2011
 Seventh Edition: February 2012
 Eighth Edition: February 2013
 Ninth Edition: February 2014
 Tenth Edition: February 2015
 Eleventh Edition:  April 2016
 Twelfth Edition: August 2017
 Thirteenth Edition: November 2019

Themes
 2006: ‘Water'
 2007: ‘Earth'
 2008: ‘Energy'
 2009: ‘Food Sovereignty'
 2010: ‘State, Communal and Developmental Conflicts in South Asia'
 2011: ‘Political Filmmaking and Media Activism in South Asia'
 2012: 'South Asia: Lives and Livelihood'
 2013: 'Stolen Democracies'
 2014: 'Gender Justice’
 2015: 'Green Growth'
 2016: 'Celebrating Cultural Diversity'
 2017: 'Dissent'
 2019: 'Rebooting :New India'

Films screened
 Fragments of the past
 Maruvili

References

External links
 

Film festivals in Kerala
Documentary film festivals in India
Short film festivals in India
Malayalam cinema
Festivals in Thrissur district
Culture of Thrissur
2006 establishments in Kerala